Majske Poljane  is a village in central Croatia, in the municipality/town of Glina, Sisak-Moslavina County. The village was severely affected by the 2020 Petrinja earthquake, with five deaths reported.

History

Culture
The village is within the Serbian Orthodox Church's Eparchy of Upper Karlovac. 
The Orthodox parish church, dedicated to the Resurrection of Christ, stands on the hill above the village. The one-nave building with a semicircular chapel, high wooden cassette ceilings, vault decorated with figural and plant motifs, and the wooden bell tower, was built no later than 1820. It is very likely that its predecessor, the older wooden church, stood close by and higher up the hill. While the "new church" is a one-room Krajina type of church, it is very traditional in shape and construction of the ceiling and vaults, and is similar to the chapel in Gornje Selište near Glina. The church, a pearl of folk architecture, was damaged by an earthquake of 1909 and its iconostasis, inherited from the Glina's St. George's Church, was destroyed during World War II. The extensive reconstruction and renovation work carried out on the church, which started in 1946, was only completed in 1989. The church is of great historical and architectural value.

Demographics
According to the 2011 census, the village of Majske Poljane has 196 inhabitants. This represents 32.56% of its pre-war population according to the 1991 census. 

Population by ethnicity

Sights and events
 Celebration of the Feast of Transfiguration on 19 August
 Monument to the Victims of Fascism - removed from the site and deposited into storage facilities in Glina based on the decision of the Glina Municipal Council dated 18 March 1997

Notable natives and residents 
 Đuro Kurepa (1907–1993), Yugoslav mathematician.
Svetozar Kurepa (1929–2010), Yugoslavian and Croatian mathematician whose main contributions were in the areas of functional analysis and operator theory.

 Simeon Roksandić (1874–1943), a distinguished sculptor and academic, was also born in Majske Poljane.

References

External links 
  Parohija Majske Poljane

Populated places in Sisak-Moslavina County
Glina, Croatia
Serb communities in Croatia